The 1991 NASCAR Winston Cup Series was the 43rd of professional stock car racing in the United States and the 20th modern-era Cup Season. It began February 10 and ended November 17. Dale Earnhardt of Richard Childress Racing won his fifth Winston Cup championship at the conclusion of the season. The season was marred by the death of driver and team owner J. D. McDuffie, who was killed in a wreck at Watkins Glen.

A bevy of new Pit rules were introduced at Daytona to start out the 1991 season, in response to the death of a Melling Racing rear tire changer in a pit road accident at Atlanta the previous November. The new rules changed the complexity of the races, and over the course of the season, they would be tweaked and revised. By mid-season, most of the more complicated rules were scrapped, but a few were made permanent. The pit road speed limit (at all times) and use of the "lollipop" style signboard were the significant changes made permanent (and remain to this day).

The 1991 season introduced the past champion's provisional (also known as the "Petty rule"), which allowed a former Cup Series champion to claim the final starting position in a race if he failed to qualify on speed, and if he was too low in the points standings to secure an ordinary provisional spot. If there were two or more former champions that failed to qualify, the Champion's Provisional would be awarded to the most recent champion. This rule was implemented after Richard Petty failed to qualify for four races in 1989, resulting in a drop in ratings that season.

The 1991 season was also the final year for Buick as a full-time manufacturer in the series; Buick cars would run only limited schedules in 1992 and 1993 before leaving the series for good.

The Nashville Network debuted as a cable television partner with the Cup Series in 1991. For 1991, there were five television networks broadcasting the 29-race Winston Cup Series schedule: CBS, ABC, ESPN, TBS, and TNN.

This would be the last season until 2017 without Jeff Gordon.

1991 NASCAR Winston Cup Series drivers

Full-time teams

Part-time teams

Schedule

Races

Busch Clash 
The Busch Clash, an invitational event for all Busch Pole winners the previous year, was held February 10 at Daytona International Speedway. The #10 of Derrike Cope started in first (the starting grid was determined by a blind draw).

Top ten results

 3–Dale Earnhardt
 6–Mark Martin
 9–Bill Elliott
 4–Ernie Irvan
 2–Rusty Wallace
 25–Ken Schrader
 42–Kyle Petty
 5–Ricky Rudd
 11–Geoff Bodine
 26–Brett Bodine

After several years of mediocre competition, the race's format was slightly re-tooled. Instead of a single 20-lap sprint, the race was divided into two 10-lap segments. After the first 10-lap half, the caution was displayed (caution laps did not count), freezing the field. The field was inverted for the second 10-lap half. Prize money was awarded for finishing positions in both halves, encouraging drivers to race hard during the first segment, and not hold back or "sandbag" in order to start up front for the second half.

Gatorade 125s 
The Gatorade 125s, qualifying races for the Daytona 500 were held February 14 at Daytona International Speedway. Davey Allison and Ernie Irvan won the pole for each race, respectively.

Race one: top ten results

 28–Davey Allison
 43–Richard Petty
 12–Hut Stricklin
 1–Rick Mast
 5–Ricky Rudd
 33–Harry Gant
 30–Michael Waltrip
 9–Bill Elliott
 21–Dale Jarrett
 11–Geoff Bodine

Race two: top ten results

 3–Dale Earnhardt
 4–Ernie Irvan
 42–Kyle Petty
 2–Rusty Wallace
 17–Darrell Waltrip
 22–Sterling Marlin
 75–Joe Ruttman
 88–Buddy Baker
 6–Mark Martin
 68–Bobby Hamilton

Daytona 500 by STP 
The Daytona 500 by STP was held on February 17 at Daytona International Speedway. Davey Allison won the pole.

Top ten results

 4–Ernie Irvan
 22–Sterling Marlin
 75–Joe Ruttman
 1–Rick Mast
 3–Dale Earnhardt
 21–Dale Jarrett −1
 27–Bobby Hillin Jr. −1
 7–Alan Kulwicki −1
 5–Ricky Rudd −1
 68–Bobby Hamilton −1

A bevy of new Pit rules were introduced at Daytona to start out the 1991 season, in response to the death of a Melling Racing rear tire changer in a pit road accident at Atlanta the previous November. The new rules changed the complexity of the race, and would be tweaked and revised over the next several races.
Earnhardt was again a dominating factor, but for the 13th time in his career, he came away empty. After a late-race caution, Irvan led, Earnhardt was second and pole-sitter Davey Allison was third. Earnhardt and Allison battled door-to-door for three laps while Irvan inched out to a slight advantage. Finally, with three laps remaining, Allison and Earnhardt touched, sending both of them into a wild spin. The race finished under caution with Irvan scoring the most significant win of a NASCAR Winston Cup competitor's career. Sterling Marlin, in his first race with Junior Johnson, finished second followed by Joe Ruttman, Rick Mast and Earnhardt. Irvan won the first leg of the Winston Million races and qualified for the $1 million bonus. To collect the Winston bonus, he would have needed to win two of the three remaining "Crown Jewel" races, the Winston 500, Coca-Cola 600 or Southern 500, a feat which he failed to accomplish this year.

Pontiac Excitement 400 
The Pontiac Excitement 400 was held February 24 at Richmond International Raceway. The #28 of Davey Allison won the pole.

Top ten results

 3–Dale Earnhardt
 5–Ricky Rudd
 33–Harry Gant
 2–Rusty Wallace
 7–Alan Kulwicki
 6–Mark Martin
 17–Darrell Waltrip
 15–Morgan Shepherd −1
 22–Sterling Marlin −2
 25–Ken Schrader −2

Failed to qualify:
70–J. D. McDuffie

Fueled by his Daytona disappointment, Earnhardt rebounded with a heart-stopping  car length victory over Ricky Rudd. Ironically, the door-to-door battle between the two Chevrolet drivers proved to be a prelude to the chase for the $1 million NASCAR Winston Cup points title. Earnhardt left Richmond with a 340–318 point lead over Rudd. The two drivers would remain 1–2 all season long, occasionally trading the point.

Goodwrench 500 
The Goodwrench 500 was held March 3 at North Carolina Motor Speedway. Kyle Petty won the pole.

Top ten results

 42–Kyle Petty
 25–Ken Schrader
 33–Harry Gant −1
 5–Ricky Rudd −1
 9–Bill Elliott −1
 4–Ernie Irvan −2
 30–Michael Waltrip −2
 3–Dale Earnhardt −3
 17–Darrell Waltrip −4
 15–Morgan Shepherd −4

Failed to qualify:
64–Gary Wright, 70–J. D. McDuffie, 82–Mark Stahl

This was the first live flag to flag Winston Cup Series race televised on TNN. Both races at Rockingham, along with Dover, and the series penultimate race at Phoenix, switched from ESPN to TNN starting in 1991. This was after ESPN moved some races to tape delay at the last minute in 1990. ESPN likewise decided to drop some of the longer, less-prestigious events, in favor of freeing up their schedules in favor of other sports (which they were rapidly gaining rights to at the time). This was not the first race ever on TNN, however. Previous Winston Cup races had been shown tape delayed on American Sports Cavalcade.

Motorcraft 500 
The Motorcraft 500 started on March 18 but heavy rain forced the finish of the race to be postponed to March 19, the race was run at Atlanta Motor Speedway. Alan Kulwicki won the pole.

Top ten results

 25–Ken Schrader
 9–Bill Elliott
 3–Dale Earnhardt
 15–Morgan Shepherd
 30–Michael Waltrip
 5–Ricky Rudd
 22–Sterling Marlin
 7–Alan Kulwicki* −1
 17–Darrell Waltrip −1
 2–Rusty Wallace −1

Failed to qualify:
49–Stanley Smith, 82–Mark Stahl*

This was the last NASCAR race in this series not to be televised. It has been slated to air on ABC but was a two-day race because of rain early in the race. The majority of the race was not televised on TV (Motor Racing Network was able to cover the entirety of the race on the radio) and results were only available on local news.

TranSouth 500 
The TranSouth 500 was held April 7 at Darlington Raceway. Geoff Bodine won the pole.

Top ten results

 5–Ricky Rudd
 28–Davey Allison
 30–Michael Waltrip
 6–Mark Martin −1
 2–Rusty Wallace −2
 42–Kyle Petty −2
 4–Ernie Irvan −2
 15–Morgan Shepherd −2
 11–Geoff Bodine −2
 22–Sterling Marlin −2

Failed to qualify: #82–Mark Stahl

Valleydale Meats 500 
The Valleydale Meats 500 was held April 14 at Bristol Motor Speedway. Rusty Wallace won the pole.

Top ten results

 2–Rusty Wallace
 4–Ernie Irvan
 28–Davey Allison
 6–Mark Martin
 5–Ricky Rudd
 17–Darrell Waltrip
 21–Dale Jarrett
 98–Jimmy Spencer
 94–Terry Labonte
 15–Morgan Shepherd −2

Failed to qualify:
52–Jimmy Means, 70–J. D. McDuffie, 71–Dave Marcis

Sterling Marlin suffered second and third degree burns following a crash late in the race.
After numerous complaints about the pit road procedure where cars could not pit for tires under caution, NASCAR attempted a new procedure for cautions.  When the pits opened, the blue flag waved to permit the odd-numbered cars to pit first.  The second lap, the even-numbered cars (based on starting position) would then be able to pit.  The blue-sticker cars lined up on the inside, the orange-sticker cars on the outside, and lapped cars to the rear on all restarts.  Pit road was open for any car on green flag situations.
ESPN moved the finish of the race on tape delay because of a rain delay lasting 1 hour and 12 minutes.

First Union 400 
The First Union 400 was held April 21 at North Wilkesboro Speedway.  The #26 of Brett Bodine won the pole.

Top ten results

 17–Darrell Waltrip
 3–Dale Earnhardt
 98–Jimmy Spencer
 15–Morgan Shepherd
 25–Ken Schrader
 28–Davey Allison
 30–Michael Waltrip
 9–Bill Elliott
 6–Mark Martin
 4–Ernie Irvan

Failed to qualify:
19–Chad Little, 41–Larry Pearson, 44–Irv Hoerr, 47–Rich Bickle, 51–Jeff Purvis, 52–Jimmy Means, 70–J. D. McDuffie, 76–Bill Sedgwick

NASCAR tinkered and modified the pit procedure one final time. The odd/even policy was abandoned. On the first lap of a caution flag after the field had lined up behind the pace car, all cars on the lead lap could pit.  On the second lap of caution following the opening of pit road, all of the cars that were not on the lead lap could pit.  The rule was waived if NASCAR called a "quickie caution".  A new pit speed limit was implemented, and for the remainder of the 1991 season, cars would be run through pit road for tachometer readings. The use of a "second" pace car during cautions for the pit road (to control the speed) was abandoned. The pit speed limit was in place for all situations when a car was on pit road, including green flag stops. A violation of the speed limit on entrance was subject to a 15-second holding penalty before the car exited the pit. A violation on exit was subject to a stop-and-go penalty.  A violation under caution resulted in being sent to the rear of the field on the ensuing restart.
Waltrip's victory set a modern era NASCAR record with seven different winners in the first seven races of the season (at the time). It was the overall longest such streak since 1964.
Sterling Marlin, still recovering from burns suffered in his accident the previous week, was relieved by Charlie Glotzbach shortly after the start of the race.

Hanes 500 
The Hanes 500 was held April 28 at Martinsville Speedway.  The #6 of Mark Martin won the pole.

Top ten results

 3–Dale Earnhardt
 42–Kyle Petty
 17–Darrell Waltrip
 26–Brett Bodine
 33–Harry Gant −1
 98–Jimmy Spencer −1
 30–Michael Waltrip −1
 28–Davey Allison −1
 7–Alan Kulwicki −3
 12–Hut Stricklin −4

Failed to qualify:
10–Derrike Cope, 52–Jimmy Means, 68–Bobby Hamilton, 70–J. D. McDuffie, 71–Dave Marcis

Dale Earnhardt becomes the 9th driver to win 50+ NASCAR races.
Ernie Irvan required relief from Dick Trickle during the race due to heat exhaustion.  Trickle had started the race in the #34 Buick for owner Ken Allen, but finished last (32nd) after overheating problems popped up after only 12 laps.

Winston 500 
The Winston 500 was scheduled for Sunday, May 5 but was delayed to Monday, May 6 due to rain at Talladega Superspeedway. Ernie Irvan won the pole.

Top ten results

 33–Harry Gant
 17–Darrell Waltrip
 3–Dale Earnhardt
 22–Sterling Marlin
 30–Michael Waltrip
 11–Geoff Bodine
 25–Ken Schrader
 9–Bill Elliott
 98–Jimmy Spencer
 1–Rick Mast −1

Failed to qualify:
59–Mark Gibson, 65–Dave Mader III, 70–J. D. McDuffie, 77–Ken Ragan, 53–Don Paul

Ernie Irvan was also the center of controversy after "The Big One" on lap 71, which took out 20 cars and injured Kyle Petty, who was out until the Southern 500 in September due to a broken leg.
During the Big One on lap 71, Mark Martin's car became airborne, lifting to its nose, but it did not flip over.
Harry Gant won the race on a gas-mileage gamble. He out-lasted Darrell Waltrip and Dale Earnhardt, and reportedly ran out of fuel right after taking the checkered flag.
A mild controversy stirred up after the race, where it appeared Gant was being pushed by his teammate Rick Mast on the final lap (pushing is not allowed on the final lap). Video footage was inconclusive, and the results were unchanged. Gant and Mast insisted they were simply drafting very closely.
Dale Earnhardt would take over the points lead from Ricky Rudd. He would hold on to the lead for the rest of 1991.
Footage of Kyle Petty's rehabilitation from his injury was shown during the starting lineup on the telecast of the 1992 Daytona 500 on CBS.

The Winston 

The Winston, an invitational event for all past winners in the Cup series and the top three finishers in The Winston Open, was held May 19 at Charlotte Motor Speedway. Davey Allison won the pole.

Top ten results

 28–Davey Allison
 25–Ken Schrader
 17–Darrell Waltrip
 9–Bill Elliott
 4–Ernie Irvan
 30–Michael Waltrip (Winston Open Winner)
 2–Rusty Wallace
 12–Hut Stricklin (Winston Open 3rd place)
 33–Harry Gant
 3–Dale Earnhardt

Winston Open 
The Winston Open, a qualifying race for drivers who are normally not eligible for The Winston, was held May 19 at Charlotte Motor Speedway. Michael Waltrip won the pole. The top three finishers would be eligible to run in The Winston later that day.

Top ten results

 30–Michael Waltrip
 22–Sterling Marlin
 12–Hut Stricklin
 1–Rick Mast
 68–Bobby Hamilton
 43–Richard Petty
 47–Greg Sacks
 19–Chad Little
 94–Terry Labonte
 71–Dave Marcis

Winston Legends Race 
During the festivities of The Winston, a special exhibition race of 22 retired NASCAR legends took place on a quarter-mile oval paved in the quad oval segment of the speedway. Elmo Langley battled Cale Yarborough on the final lap, and held him off for the victory by less than a car length. Dick Brooks started on the pole.

Top ten results

 64–Elmo Langley
 11–Cale Yarborough
 99–Paul Goldsmith
 06–Neil Castles
 28–Fred Lorenzen
 14–Coo Coo Marlin
 61–Hoss Ellington
 90–Dick Brooks
 42–Marvin Panch
 300–Tim Flock

The race was shortened by 10 laps due to damp conditions.

Coca-Cola 600 
The Coca-Cola 600 was held May 26 at Charlotte Motor Speedway.  The #6 of Mark Martin won the pole.

Top ten results

 28–Davey Allison
 25–Ken Schrader
 3–Dale Earnhardt
 33–Harry Gant
 21–Dale Jarrett
 12–Hut Stricklin
 4–Ernie Irvan −1
 17–Darrell Waltrip −1
 5–Ricky Rudd −1
 94–Terry Labonte −1

Failed to qualify:
29–Kerry Teague, 44–Bobby Labonte, 70–J. D. McDuffie, 82–Mark Stahl, 99–Brad Teague, 86–Jeff Green

During the previous week's The Winston, the #11 Junior Johnson-owned Ford was thrown out of the track.  Johnson, crew chief Tim Brewer, and substitute driver Tommy Ellis were suspended for 12 weeks for the engine being larger than the legal limit of 358 cubic inches.  Regular driver Geoff Bodine was injured in a practice crash for The Winston at Charlotte and was out for two races plus The Winston.  All three parties appealed;  Johnson and Brewer's suspensions were cut to four races, and Ellis, who drove as a late substitute, had his suspension nullified.  Here, Ellis finished the race in 16th, 4 laps down.  During the ban, Johnson designated his wife Flossie as the car owner and changed the number of the car to 97.

Budweiser 500 

The Budweiser 500 was held June 3 at Dover Downs International Speedway.  The #30 of Michael Waltrip* won the pole.

Top ten results

 25–Ken Schrader*
 3–Dale Earnhardt
 33–Harry Gant
 4–Ernie Irvan
 6–Mark Martin
 12–Hut Stricklin
 17–Darrell Waltrip −1
 15–Morgan Shepherd −2
 2–Rusty Wallace −2
 5–Ricky Rudd −3

Failed to qualify:
45-Billy Fulcher, 80-Jimmy Horton, 85-Bobby Gerhart, 47-Rich Bickle

This race marked Ken Schrader's fourth and last victory in the Winston Cup Series. All four of his Cup Series wins came in the #25 car for Hendrick Motorsports.
This was Michael Waltrip's first career pole position in the Winston Cup Series.

Banquet Frozen Foods 300 

The Banquet Frozen Foods 300 was held June 9 at Sears Point Raceway. Ricky Rudd won the pole.

Top ten results
 28–Davey Allison
 5–Ricky Rudd
 2–Rusty Wallace
 4–Ernie Irvan
 25–Ken Schrader
 94–Terry Labonte
 3–Dale Earnhardt
 97–Geoff Bodine*
 6–Mark Martin
 30–Michael Waltrip

A wild finish ended in controversy. Accomplished Trans-Am champion and NASCAR road course ringer Tommy Kendall (substituting for the injured Kyle Petty) was leading Mark Martin with 4 laps to go, in Felix Sabates' #42 Pontiac. Going into the turn 7 hairpin, Martin slid by on the outside, but the cars made contact, and Martin spun out. Kendall suffered a flat tire, and limped back to the pits. With 2 laps remaining, Davey Allison who had been running third took the lead. Allison led Ricky Rudd into turn 11 as the cars were anticipating seeing the white flag. Rudd's nose got inside, touched Allison's rear bumper, and Allison spun out with the white flag waving. Allison refired, and got back on to the track to hold on to second position. The next time by, Ricky Rudd was displayed the black flag and penalized 5 seconds for "dirty driving." Allison, the second car in line, was given the checkered flag and declared the winner. Rudd officially dropped back to 2nd place, with the black flag being reduced to a 5-second penalty following Allison's time of victory. After the race, Dave Marcis, a lapped car who was right behind the incident and saw it unfold, claimed that Rudd's tap was not dirty, and in his opinion was simply drivers racing hard on the final lap.
Geoff Bodine returned after missing two races and The Winston because of an injury during a practice crash for The Winston.

Champion Spark Plug 500 
The Champion Spark Plug 500 was held June 16 at Pocono Raceway.  Mark Martin won the pole.

Top ten results

 17–Darrell Waltrip
 3–Dale Earnhardt
 6–Mark Martin
 33–Harry Gant
 97–Geoff Bodine
 4–Ernie Irvan
 25–Ken Schrader
 22–Sterling Marlin
 15–Morgan Shepherd
 10–Derrike Cope

A caution flag was thrown during the race for (oddly enough) a chicken attempting to cross the track.
This race was plagued by rain, even causing a red flag at one point, but it still ran to the full 500 mile distance.
During the race, the wife of ESPN color commentator Benny Parsons, Connie, died of an illness. ESPN announcers Bob Jenkins and Ned Jarrett broke word of her death coming back from a commercial. A video exists of the satellite feed, in which Jenkins and Jarrett were informed of Connie's passing (Benny Parsons was in North Carolina with her), and previewed an obituary slide that was shown after the commercial break.
Bill Elliott, whose day ended early with a valve problem, would leave to return to his hometown of Dawsonville, Georgia, as his grandmother also died later on that same day (when interviewed after his car's problems developed, he mentioned that he had no word of his grandmother's condition at the time of the interview, but that she was still alive before the race began).

Miller Genuine Draft 400 
The Miller Genuine Draft 400 was held June 23 at Michigan International Speedway.  The #30 of Michael Waltrip won the pole.

Top ten results

 28–Davey Allison
 12–Hut Stricklin
 6–Mark Martin
 3–Dale Earnhardt
 4–Ernie Irvan
 25–Ken Schrader
 17–Darrell Waltrip
 5–Ricky Rudd
 15–Morgan Shepherd –1
 33–Harry Gant –1

Failed to qualify: #70–J. D. McDuffie, #53–Don Paul
 Geoff Bodine's team reverted to the #11 following owner Junior Johnson's return from his 4-race suspension.

Pepsi 400 
The Pepsi 400 was held July 6 at Daytona International Speedway.  Sterling Marlin won the pole.

Top ten results

 9–Bill Elliott
 11–Geoff Bodine
 28–Davey Allison
 25–Ken Schrader
 4–Ernie Irvan
 30–Michael Waltrip
 3–Dale Earnhardt
 22–Sterling Marlin
 5–Ricky Rudd
 98–Jimmy Spencer

Failed to qualify:
95–Kerry Teague, 70–J. D. McDuffie, 80–Jimmy Horton, 95–Eddie Bierschwale, 0–Delma Cowart

This race is probably best known for a wild crash involving the #17 of Darrell Waltrip and the #75 of Joe Ruttman on lap 119.  Sterling Marlin got loose, slid into Alan Kulwicki, and Kulwicki slid into Ruttman. Waltrip and Ruttman hooked together on the backstretch and veered into the grass, jumping over part of the infield road course (both cars got all 4 wheels off the ground when this happened).  Waltrip's car landed hard on the left side, dug into the dirt and grass, and barrel rolled while Ruttman's car spun back toward the racing surface.
This was Bill Elliott's last win for Melling Racing; he would drive for Junior Johnson beginning in 1992. It was also Elliott's only win in a car that was not red (it was a blue Ford Thunderbird, sponsored by Coors Light).
This race was the first race Benny Parsons covered for ESPN after the loss of his wife Connie three weeks earlier.
A bizarre sidelight emerged involving Terry Labonte (driving the #94 Sunoco Oldsmobile Cutlass). Labonte would drop out of the race after 8 laps claiming an engine vibration, but when the car was tested in the garage, the engine was working normally. By that time, however, Labonte had already left and with the team unable to find a replacement driver, it was ultimately decided that the car would not attempt to return to the race. However, more info about this came to light in a book called Behind The Wall by Richard Huff where Labonte stated that the wrong car type was brought to the track (Intermediate car instead of Superspeedway car) and Labonte refused to continue due to the car being so slow; it would not keep up in the draft.

Miller Genuine Draft 500 
The Miller Genuine Draft 500 was held July 21 at Pocono Raceway.  The #7 of Alan Kulwicki won the pole. The race was shortened to 179 laps due to rain.

Top ten results

 2–Rusty Wallace*
 6–Mark Martin
 11–Geoff Bodine
 12–Hut Stricklin
 22–Sterling Marlin
 21–Dale Jarrett
 4–Ernie Irvan
 26–Brett Bodine
 9–Bill Elliott −1
 75–Joe Ruttman −1

Failed to qualify:
85–Bobby Gerhart, Walter Surma, Norm Benning

On lap 72, a major crash on the frontstretch happened involving twelve cars. Among those involved were polesitter Irvin, Earnhardt, and Stricklin
When the red flag was thrown for rain, Rusty Wallace's car was nearly out of gas. The red flag was out for over two hours before the track dried and the cars were started again under a yellow condition. However, after just running 1 lap under yellow the rain started falling again. Rusty Wallace was very close to running out of gas, so he was pushed around by Dale Earnhardt so that he wouldn't run out of gas. Once the field was given the white flag, Earnhardt backed off. Under NASCAR rules, this is legal unless it is the final scheduled lap of the race.
This was the final race J. D. McDuffie actually finished on track in. He finished in 25th, 27 laps down to the winner.

DieHard 500 
The DieHard 500 was held July 28 at Talladega Superspeedway.  Sterling Marlin won the pole.

Top ten results

 3–Dale Earnhardt
 9–Bill Elliott
 6–Mark Martin
 5–Ricky Rudd
 22–Sterling Marlin
 2–Rusty Wallace
 30–Michael Waltrip
 21–Dale Jarrett
 28–Davey Allison
 75–Joe Ruttman

Failed to qualify:
0–Delma Cowart, 51–Jeff Purvis, Walter Surma

This race featured a blowover crash for the #1 of Rick Mast after he was spun around in the tri-oval by the #20 of Buddy Baker on lap 166.

Budweiser at The Glen 

The Budweiser at The Glen was held August 11 at Watkins Glen International. Terry Labonte won the pole.

Top ten results

 4–Ernie Irvan
 5–Ricky Rudd
 6–Mark Martin
 2–Rusty Wallace
 21–Dale Jarrett
 17–Darrell Waltrip
 9–Bill Elliott
 12–Hut Stricklin
 43–Richard Petty
 28–Davey Allison

Failed to qualify: 89–Jim Sauter, 65–Jerry O'Neil, 45–Ed Ferree

The race was marred by the death of veteran J. D. McDuffie in a Lap 5 crash in the Loop with the #52 of Jimmy Means. The other drivers were not informed of McDuffie's death until after the race.
Nine months later, Bianchi died from complications of the head trauma.
McDuffie's crash was just one in a long series of big wrecks in the Loop-Chute area at Watkins Glen in 1991. Before this crash, Tommy Kendall had broken both legs in the IMSA Camel Continental race in June after spinning out at 180 mph and hitting the Armco head on. Multiple drivers in the Winston Cup Series and in IROC crashed in Turn 5 during the August race weekend. A bus stop chicane (Inner Loop) was added before the entrance of Turn 5 for the 1992 season to slow cars before the entrance of what is now the Carousel.
Chip Williams, a media coordinator for NASCAR, made the first announcement of McDuffie's death, which was after the red flag period ended, in an interview with Jerry Punch of ESPN that was simulcast on Motor Racing Network.
Last career top 10 for Richard Petty.

Champion Spark Plug 400 
The Champion Spark Plug 400 was held August 18 at Michigan International Speedway. Alan Kulwicki won the pole.

Top ten results

 21–Dale Jarrett*
 28–Davey Allison
 2–Rusty Wallace
 6–Mark Martin
 9–Bill Elliott
 33–Harry Gant
 4–Ernie Irvan
 7–Alan Kulwicki
 30–Michael Waltrip
 25–Ken Schrader −1

Failed to qualify: 53–John Paul Jr., 82–Mark Stahl

This was Dale Jarrett's first career Winston Cup victory. Jarrett raced door to door to the finish line with the #28 of Davey Allison. The official margin of victory was 10 inches. The win was special to Dale's father Ned Jarrett who was in the ESPN broadcast booth for the telecast.

Bud 500 
The Bud 500 was held August 24 at Bristol International Raceway. The #9 of Bill Elliott won the pole.

Top ten results

 7–Alan Kulwicki
 22–Sterling Marlin
 25–Ken Schrader
 6–Mark Martin −1
 5–Ricky Rudd −1
 15–Morgan Shepherd −2
 3–Dale Earnhardt −2
 17–Darrell Waltrip −2
 94–Terry Labonte −7
 26–Brett Bodine −7

Failed to qualify:
41–Larry Pearson, 52–Jimmy Means

Jimmy Spencer led the majority of the race and appeared to be on his way to his first victory, but two late pit stop errors cost him the victory and Spencer would eventually fall to mechanical issues. During the race, Rick Wilson needed relief from Bobby Labonte after Wilson was suffering from flu-like symptoms.

Heinz Southern 500 
The Heinz Southern 500 was held September 1 at Darlington Raceway. The #28 of Davey Allison won the pole.

Top ten results

 33–Harry Gant
 4–Ernie Irvan
 25–Ken Schrader
 10–Derrike Cope −1
 94–Terry Labonte −1
 22–Sterling Marlin −2
 11–Geoff Bodine −2
 3–Dale Earnhardt −2
 75–Joe Ruttman −2
 68–Bobby Hamilton −3

This was Kyle Petty's first race since breaking his leg at Talladega in May.
No driver was eligible for the Winston million; however, three drivers going into this race (Ernie Irvan, Davey Allison, and Harry Gant) were eligible for a $100,000 bonus from Winston if a driver were to win 2 out of the 4 NASCAR majors. Gant won the bonus by winning the Winston 500 and this race.

Miller Genuine Draft 400 
The Miller Genuine Draft 400 was held September 7 at Richmond International Raceway.  Rusty Wallace won the pole.

Top ten results

 33–Harry Gant
 28–Davey Allison
 2–Rusty Wallace
 4–Ernie Irvan
 5–Ricky Rudd
 7–Alan Kulwicki
 17–Darrell Waltrip
 25–Ken Schrader
 9–Bill Elliott
 22–Sterling Marlin −1

This was the 1st night race for the Winston Cup Series held at Richmond International Raceway.
This was Harry Gant's second consecutive victory.
Richard Petty led his lone lap of 1991; it also was the only lap he ever led on the 3/4 mile configuration of Richmond.

Peak Antifreeze 500 
The Peak Antifreeze 500 was held September 15 at Dover Downs International Speedway.  The #7 of Alan Kulwicki won the pole.

Top ten results

 33–Harry Gant
 11–Geoff Bodine −1
 15–Morgan Shepherd −1
 12–Hut Stricklin −1
 30–Michael Waltrip −2
 24–Dick Trickle −4
 5–Ricky Rudd −7
 68–Bobby Hamilton −7
 1–Rick Mast −7
 71–Dave Marcis −10

Harry Gant's official margin of victory in this race was 1 lap, and an additional 19 seconds.
This was Harry Gant's third consecutive victory.
Dick Trickle's last start of 1991 ended up as his best finish of 1991 (6th).

Goody's 500 
The Goody's 500 was held September 22 at Martinsville Speedway. Mark Martin won the pole.

Top ten results

 33–Harry Gant*
 26–Brett Bodine
 3–Dale Earnhardt
 4–Ernie Irvan
 6–Mark Martin
 94–Terry Labonte
 2–Rusty Wallace
 5–Ricky Rudd
 25–Ken Schrader
 24–Jimmy Hensley

Failed to qualify:
52–Jimmy Means

This was Harry Gant's 4th consecutive victory, tying the modern-era record for consecutive victories.  Gant more or less dominated the race but crashed on lap 377 in Turn 3.  The crash damaged the right front of the #33 Skoal Bandit Oldsmobile. This incident led ESPN's race analyst Benny Parsons to discount Gant as a threat to win the race.  The team repaired the car the best they could (since this was Martinsville, this consisted of removal of sheet metal that could rub against the right front tire), and sent Gant back out.  Gant proceeded to charge up through the field and overtook Brett Bodine for the victory with about 50 laps to go.

Tyson Holly Farms 400 
The Tyson Holly Farms 400 was held September 29 at North Wilkesboro Speedway. Harry Gant won the pole.

Top ten results

 3–Dale Earnhardt
 33–Harry Gant
 15–Morgan Shepherd
 28–Davey Allison
 6–Mark Martin
 2–Rusty Wallace
 26–Brett Bodine
 25–Ken Schrader
 21–Dale Jarrett
 7–Alan Kulwicki

Dale Earnhardt passed Harry Gant for the victory with 12 laps to go, denying Gant a 5th consecutive victory.  Gant had dominated the race when with just a few laps to go an O-Ring failed to give Gant limited braking for the final few laps allowing Earnhardt to pass.
Earnhardt's victory would be the last win for a General Motors brand until his victory in the 1992 Coca-Cola 600.
Brett Bodine's 7th-place finish came despite having to start at the rear of the field due to an emergency pit stop prior to the green flag start when his car began leaking fluid during the pace laps.

Mello Yello 500 
The Mello Yello 500 was held October 6 at Charlotte Motor Speedway.  The #6 of Mark Martin won the pole.

Top ten results

 11–Geoff Bodine
 28–Davey Allison
 7–Alan Kulwicki −1
 33–Harry Gant −1
 22–Sterling Marlin −3
 94–Terry Labonte −4
 30–Michael Waltrip −4
 26–Brett Bodine −4
 17–Darrell Waltrip −5
 19–Chad Little −5

Failed to qualify: 0–Delma Cowart, 41–Larry Pearson, 76–Robbie Faggart, 20–Buddy Baker, 51–Jeff Purvis, 74–Mike Potter, 89–Jim Sauter, 87–Randy Baker, 72–Tracy Leslie

 Five days before this race, Richard Petty held a press conference at his Level Cross, North Carolina race shop. Petty said that instead of retiring at the end of 1991, he would race for one more year. The 1992 NASCAR Winston Cup Series, his last as a driver, would be dubbed the "Fan Appreciation Tour". Petty denied it was a farewell tour because he "wasn't going anywhere".
 With this race and continuing into the beginning of 1992, the Ford brand would win 13 races in a row (the last four races in 1991 and the first nine races in 1992)

AC Delco 500 
The AC Delco 500 was held October 20 at North Carolina Speedway. Kyle Petty won the pole.

Top ten results

 28–Davey Allison
 33–Harry Gant
 6–Mark Martin
 11–Geoff Bodine
 25–Ken Schrader −1
 68–Bobby Hamilton −2
 3–Dale Earnhardt −2
 22–Sterling Marlin −2
 42–Kyle Petty −2
 9–Bill Elliott −2

Failed to qualify:   53–Bobby Hillin Jr., 05–Bill Meacham

This was Kyle Petty's 100th top ten finish.

Pyroil 500K 
The Pyroil 500K was held November 3 at Phoenix International Raceway. Geoff Bodine won the pole.

Top ten results

 28–Davey Allison
 17–Darrell Waltrip
 22–Sterling Marlin
 7–Alan Kulwicki
 2–Rusty Wallace
 4–Ernie Irvan
 98–Jimmy Spencer −1
 11–Geoff Bodine −1
 3–Dale Earnhardt −1
 15–Morgan Shepherd −1

Failed to qualify: 93–Troy Beebe, 44–Jack Sellers, 89–Jim Sauter, 00–Scott Gaylord
The only time that Davey Allison would score back-to-back wins in his career.

Hardee's 500 
The Hardee's 500 was held November 17 at Atlanta Motor Speedway. Bill Elliott won the pole.

Top ten results

 6–Mark Martin
 4–Ernie Irvan
 9–Bill Elliott
 33–Harry Gant
 3–Dale Earnhardt*
 15–Morgan Shepherd
 22–Sterling Marlin −1
 11–Geoff Bodine −1
 7–Alan Kulwicki −2
 17–Darrell Waltrip −2

Failed to qualify:
0–Delma Cowart, 13–Kerry Teague, 35–Bill Venturini, 36–H. B. Bailey, 59–Mark Gibson, 65–Dave Mader III, 65–Keith van Houten

This was the race in which Dale Earnhardt clinched his fifth Winston Cup championship. ESPN ran a comedic segment on "How to Steal a Championship" were two crew members from Davey Allison and Ricky Rudd's teams, which were second and third in points respectively, attempted to steal Earnhardt's driving uniform and helmet so Earnhardt could not start the race. Those efforts were thwarted by longtime Earnhardt crewman Chocolate Myers and Earnhardt won by merely starting the race and completing the first lap.

Full Drivers' Championship

(key) Bold – Pole position awarded by time. Italics – Pole position set by owner's points. * – Most laps led.

Rookie of the Year
Bobby Hamilton, driving for Tri-Star Motorsports, narrowly defeated Ted Musgrave for Rookie of the Year honors in 1991. Stanley Smith, Wally Dallenbach Jr., and Sammy Swindell also declared for the award, but did not complete enough races to challenge Hamilton or Musgrave.

See also
1991 NASCAR Busch Series

References

External links
Winston Cup standings and statistics for 1991

 
NASCAR Cup Series seasons